The Rt. Hon. Silver Oliver PC (1736 – 21 November 1798) was an Irish landowner and Privy Counsellor politician who owned Castle Oliver in County Limerick, Ireland.

Early life
He was the son of Jane Katherine (née Silver) Oliver and Robert Oliver, who also sat in the Irish House of Commons for Kilmallock.

His paternal grandfather was Robert Oliver (son of Charles Oliver who lived at Clonodfoy, County Limerick) and was also an Irish MP for Kilmallock and County Limerick.

Career
He held the office of Member of Parliament for Kilmallock in 1757. He held the office of High Sheriff of County Limerick in 1764. He held the office of Member of Parliament for County Limerick in 1768, serving until 1776. In 1769, he was appointed Privy Councillor.

Personal life
On 4 February 1759, Oliver was married to Isabella Sarah Newman (d. 1777), a daughter of Richard Newman. Together, they lived at Castle Oliver in County Limerick, Ireland. They were the parents of:

 Samual Oliver (–1769), who died young.
 Katherine Oliver (–1818), who married Henry Sandford, 1st Baron Mount Sandford, MP for Roscommon Borough (and grandson of Stephen Moore, 1st Viscount Mountcashell), in 1780.
 Richard Philip Oliver-Gascoigne (1762–1843), who married Mary Turner, daughter of Sir Charles Turner, 1st Baronet and step-daughter and heiress of Sir Thomas Gascoigne, 8th Baronet.
 Charles Silver Oliver (1763–1817), who married Maria Elizabeth Morris, daughter of banker Abraham Morris, in 1805.
 Jane Oliver, who married Rev. William Sandford, son of Henry Sandford; their son succeeded as the 2nd Baron Mount Sandford.
 Silver Oliver (1770–1834), MP for Kilmallock in 1797 who died unmarried.
 Susanna Oliver (–1857), who married Rev. Hans Hamilton, rector of Knocktopher and a son of Rt. Rev. Hugh Hamilton, in 1801.
 Isabella Sarah Oliver (b. ), who married John Waller of Castletown, son of John Thomas Waller.
 Elizabeth Oliver (b. ), who died unmarried.
 Robert Oliver (–1834), who married Sarah Shepley (née Barker) Sotheran, widow of William Sotheran and daughter of Edmund Barker, in 1809.

Oliver died on 21 November 1798.

References

1736 births
1798 deaths
Irish MPs 1727–1760
Irish MPs 1761–1768
Irish MPs 1769–1776
Members of the Parliament of Ireland (pre-1801) for County Limerick constituencies
Politicians from County Limerick
Members of the Privy Council of Ireland